Caruaru is a Brazilian municipality in the state of Pernambuco. The most populous city in the interior of the state, Caruaru is located in the microzone of Agreste and because of its cultural importance, it is nicknamed Capital do Agreste (Portuguese for the "capital city of the Agreste region"), Princesinha do Agreste ("Little Princess of Agreste"), and Capital do Forró ("the capital city of forró").

The city is located 140 kilometers (87 miles) from the state capital of Recife, which has an international airport. However, Caruaru has its own airport. Caruaru is renowned for its extensive Festival de São João ("Saint John's Festival"), which takes up the whole month of June, sometimes extending into July. Caruaru had a 2020 resident population of 365,278 inhabitants, living in a land area of 920.61 square kilometers (355.45 square miles).

Caruaru is the hometown, among others, of Álvaro Lins, Brazilian journalist, and Lieutenant Brigadier Reginaldo dos Santos, former dean of the Brazilian Technological Institute for Aeronautics.

History

The lands that today comprise the city of Caruaru were originally a cattle ranch owned by family Nunes dos Bezerros. This name was given because of the proximity of the farm to the Bezerros chapel. Some orphans used to live with the Nunes family. One of them, José Rodrigues de Jesus, inherited part of the estate, staying at the location that would later be named Caruaru.
There he built a chapel dedicated to the Immaculate Conception. A village started to grow around this chapel. In 1846, Friar Euzébio de Sales started to build the parish named Igreja Matriz, nowadays a cathedral. In later years, the church was rebuilt twice, the last one in 1883. The geographical position benefited the city, because it was a necessary stopover in the transportation of cattle to the interior of the state.

Geography

 State: Pernambuco
 Region: Agreste of Pernambuco
 Bordering municipalities: Toritama, Vertentes, Frei Miguelinho and Taquaritinga do Norte (N); Altinho and Agrestina (S); Brejo da Madre de Deus and São Caetano (W); Bezerros and Riacho das Almas (E)
 Area: 920.61 km2 (355.45 square miles)
 Elevation: 554 m (1,818 ft)
 Hydrography: Capibaribe, Ipojuca and Una rivers
 Vegetation: Hypoxerophilous Caatinga
 Climate: Semi-arid
 Mean annual temperature: 23.5 °C (74.3 °F)
 Main road: BR-232
 Distance to Recife - 140 km
 Distance to Gravatá - 48 km

Economy

The main economic activities in Caruaru are industry (especially textiles), tourism, commerce, and handicraft, and the primary sector, especially the raising of goats, chickens, and cattle, and the production of milk. Agricultural activity in the Caruaru area also includes beans, cassava, and maize. Caruaru also hosts one of the biggest open-air traditional handicrafts markets of Brazil, the Feira de Caruaru.

Economic Indicators

Health Indicators

Transports 

Caruaru has one regional airport, the Oscar Laranjeira Airport, it is located in the west parte of the city, the nearest major international airport is the Recife/Guararapes–Gilberto Freyre International Airport in Recife which is 138 km far from the city. The city is served by two expressways, the BR-232 and the BR-104.

Culture

Festa Junina 

Every June, as part of the nativity of St John the Baptist, Caruaru hosts one of the principal Brazilian Festa Junina. Since 1994, the festival has been held in Pátio de Eventos Luiz Gonzaga.

Sports

There are two association football (soccer) teams in the city: Clube Atlético do Porto, which plays at Antônio Inácio de Souza Stadium (capacity: 6,000), and Central Sport Club, which plays at Estádio Luiz José de Lacerda (capacity: 20,000). Both teams compete in the main series of Pernambuco's state tournament. Caruaru also hosts an annual race of the Brazilian Formula Truck competition, at the Ayrton Senna International Circuit, the state's main motor race track.

Tourism

 Video: Saint John's Festival in Caruaru
 Video: Caruaru's traditional handicraft market
 Video: Caruaru's Formula Truck race

See also

List of cities in Brazil

References

External links

 
1849 establishments in Brazil
Populated places established in 1849
Municipalities in Pernambuco